A tack is a nautical term both for the lower, windward corner of a sail and, separately, for the windward side of a sailing craft (side from which the wind is coming while under way—the starboard or port tack. Generally, a boat is on a starboard tack if the wind is coming over the starboard (right) side of boat with sails on port (left) side. Similarly, a boat is on a port tack if the wind is coming over the port (left) side of boat. However, confusion can result when a boat is on a 'run', with the wind coming directly from astern and the mainsail and jib/genoa are on opposite sides of the vessel (wing-on-wing). Therefore, the windward side is defined as the side opposite to that on which the mainsail is being carried. On a starboard tack the mainsail is carried on the port side. On a port tack the mainsail is carried on the starboard side. It is the position of the mainsail that determines the tack.

Sail corner

The tack is the corner on a fore-and-aft sail where the luff (the forward edge) and foot (the bottom edge) connect and, on a mainsail, is located near where the boom and mast connect. On a square sail or a spinnaker, the tack is the windward clew (lower corner) and also the line holding down that corner; when the vessel changes course to have the other vertical edge of the sail to the wind, the other clew becomes the tack.

Wind direction on sailing vessel

As a point of reference, tack is the alignment of the wind with respect to a sailing craft under way. If the wind is from starboard side of the sailing craft, it is on starboard tack, and if from port, on port tack. The International Regulations for Preventing Collisions at Sea for vessels underway declare that when the courses of two sailing vessels converge, the vessel on port tack must give way to a vessel on starboard tack. The maneuver of changing a sailing craft's course from one tack to the other with the wind coming across the bow is called tacking; with the wind coming across the stern, it is called jibing for fore-and-aft rigged sailing craft, or wearing ship for square-rigged vessels.

References

Bibliography
 West, Gillian, "Basic Cruising Skills", Sail Canada, 2019 (ISBN 978-1-894495-92-9)
Rousmaniere, John, The Annapolis Book of Seamanship, Simon & Schuster, 1999
 Chapman Book of Piloting (various contributors), Hearst Corporation, 1999
 Herreshoff, Halsey (consulting editor), The Sailor’s Handbook, Little Brown and Company
 Seidman, David, The Complete Sailor, International Marine, 1995
 Jobson, Gary, Sailing Fundamentals, Simon & Schuster, 1987

Sailing rigs and rigging
Nautical terminology